Gambusia aestiputeus is a species of fish in the family Poeciliidae. It is endemic to Colombia.

References

aestiputeus
Freshwater fish of Colombia
Taxonomy articles created by Polbot